Machapuchare may refer to:
Machapuchare, a mountain situated in Gandaki Province
Machhapuchchhre Rural Municipality, Gaunpalika in Gandaki
Machhapuchchhre Bank, a bank in Nepal